National Geographic (formerly National Geographic Channel and abbreviated as NatGeo) is a Latin America specialty channel owned by National Geographic  It features documentary and human interest programming that explores the natural world. The service, like its international counterparts, is based on National Geographic Magazine.

Programming 
Programming includes specials and theme weeks such as 'Shark Week'. The programs broadcast revolve around the following topics: wildlife, history, science and technology, people and culture, and travel and adventure.

History 

The channel was launched on November 1, 2000 under the ownership of the U.S.-based National Geographic Channel.

See also 
 National Geographic Channel

References

External links 

 

Documentary television channels
Latin American cable television networks
Television channels and stations established in 2000
National Geographic Partners
The Walt Disney Company Latin America

es:National Geographic (Latinoamérica)
pt:National Geographic América Latina